The National Party of the Fatherland, usually translated as the National Pro Patria Party or simply the Pro Patria Party, was a far-right political party which was the sole-legal political party in El Salvador from its establishment in 1933 until its dissolution in 1945. The party was founded by President General Maximiliano Hernández Martínez to support his government.

History 

The National Pro Patria Party was founded in June 1933 by General Maximiliano Hernández Martínez, the acting president of El Salvador, to support his presidential campaign for the upcoming 1935 presidential election. The National Pro Patria Party was the country's sole-legal political party. The party was governed by the supreme council, which was composed of Hernández Martínez, members of his cabinet, and other high ranking government officials. It had its first meeting in July 1933.

In the 1935 election, Hernández Martínez was the only candidate, winning all 329,55 votes. He again ran unopposed in the 1939 presidential election, where he again won all 210,810 votes, and again in 1944, however, no results were published.

After an attempted coup and widespread student protests against his government, Hernández Martínez resigned and fled the country in May 1944. He was succeeded by Andrés Ignacio Menéndez, but he was deposed by Osmín Aguirre y Salinas in October 1944, ending the rule of the National Pro Patria Party. The party was declared to be dissolved by the Salvadoran government in 1945.

Electoral history

Presidential elections

Legislative Assembly elections

National Pro Patria Party presidents of El Salvador

Timeline

References

Citations

Bibliography 

 
 
 
 
 

Defunct political parties in El Salvador
Political parties established in 1933
Political parties disestablished in 1945
Parties of one-party systems
Salvadoran nationalism
1930s establishments in El Salvador
1940s disestablishments in El Salvador
Fascist parties
Fascism in El Salvador